Arthur Chichester, 1st Marquess of Donegall (13 June 1739 – 5 January 1799), known as Arthur Chichester until 1757 and as The Earl of Donegall between 1757 and 1791, was an English nobleman and politician in Ireland.

Background and education
He was educated at Trinity College, Oxford before succeeding his uncle in 1757 as fifth Earl of Donegall.

Political career
After taking his seat in the Irish House of Lords in 1765, Donegall served at Westminster as Member of Parliament for Malmesbury (1768–1774). As a means of securing his support for the Government in the Irish House of Commons, he was in 1790 created Baron Fisherwick, of Fisherwick in the County of Stafford, in the Peerage of Great Britain. The following year he was also created Earl of Belfast and Marquess of Donegall in the Peerage of Ireland.

Family
Lord Donegall married three times. On 11 September 1761, he  married firstly, Lady Anne Hamilton, daughter of James Hamilton, 5th Duke of Hamilton. They had seven children:
Lady Charlotte Anne Chichester (b. 6 September 1762), died an infant
Lady Henrietta Chichester (b. 16 January 1765), died an infant
George Chichester, 2nd Marquess of Donegall (1769–1844)
Hon. Arthur Chichester (3 May 1771 – 11 September 1788)
Lord Spencer Stanley Chichester (1775–1819)
Lady Elizabeth Juliana Chichester (d. 24 April 1787)
Lady Amelia Chichester, died an infant

On 24 October 1788 he married secondly, Charlotte Moore, née Spencer, daughter of Conway Spencer, and relict of Thomas Moore. She died 19 September 1789.

In October 1790 he married thirdly, Barbara, daughter of the Rev. Dr. Luke Godfrey.

Lord Donegall held on lease a country residence at Butley Priory, Suffolk. He died, aged 59, at his London home in St James's Square, Westminster.

References

1739 births
1799 deaths
Alumni of Trinity College, Oxford
Members of the Privy Council of Ireland
British MPs 1768–1774
Arthur
Members of the Parliament of Great Britain for English constituencies
1
Peers of Great Britain created by George III